A.E.P. Olympias Patras B.C., is a Greek professional basketball club that is located in Patras, Greece. The club is also known as Olimpiada Patron B.C.

Logos

History 
The basketball team participated in the Greek A2 League from 1977 until 1981. The club competed in the top Greek League in the 2006–07 season and the 2007–08 season. Olympias Patras' basketball club also participated in the FIBA EuroCup during the 2007–08 season.

Arenas
Olympias' home arena is the 2,500 seat Olympiada Indoor Hall. The club has also used the 4,150 seat Dimitris Tofalos Arena, to host home games.

Titles 
Greek A2 League 
Champions (1): 2005–06
Greek C League 
Champions (1): 2002–03
Achaea Regional Champion
Champions (4): 1965, 1967, 1968, 1998

Season by season

Notable players

Head coaches 
 Dimitris Tsolakis
 Yannis Christopoulos
 Nikos Oikonomou

External links 
AEP Olympias - Official Website 
Eurobasket.com Team Page
Dimitris Tofalos Arena In Patras

Basketball teams established in 1961
Basketball teams in Greece
Sport in Patras
1961 establishments in Greece